The 2001 FIA GT A1-Ring 500 km was the eighth round the 2001 FIA GT Championship season.  It took place at the A1-Ring, Austria, on August 26, 2001.

Official results
Class winners in bold.  Cars failing to complete 70% of winner's distance marked as Not Classified (NC).

Statistics
 Pole position – #15 Prodrive All-Stars – 1:30.856
 Fastest lap – #1 Lister Storm Racing – 1:30.364
 Average speed – 165.670 km/h

References

 
 
 

A
A1-Ring 500km